The Baedeker Blitz or Baedeker raids was a series of aerial attacks in April and May 1942 by the German Luftwaffe on English cities during the Second World War. The name derives from Baedeker, a series of German tourist guide books, including detailed maps, which were used to select targets for bombing.

The raids were planned in response to a devastating increase in the effectiveness of the Royal Air Force's (RAF) bombing offensive on civilian targets after the Area Bombing Directive (General Directive No.5 (S.46368/111. D.C.A.S), starting with the bombing of Lübeck in March 1942. The aim was to begin a tit-for-tat exchange with the hope of forcing the RAF to reduce their attacks. To increase the effect on civilian morale, targets were chosen for their cultural and historical significance, rather than for any military value.

The majority of the raids took place in late April 1942 through May 1942, but towns and cities continued to be targeted for their cultural value over the following two years.

By any measure, the attempt was a failure. In the time following the original German bombing campaign of 1940–41 ("The Blitz"), a little over a year earlier, the RAF had dramatically improved its night fighter capability and introduced the AMES Type 7 radar specifically for the night fighting role. Losses to the Luftwaffe's bomber force were unsustainable, and for a variety of reasons the damage to the targeted cities was minimal compared to the Blitz or to the contemporaneous RAF bombing campaign against Germany. Nevertheless, the raids resulted in over 1,600 civilian deaths and tens of thousands of damaged homes.

Background
By the winter of 1941/1942 both the British and German strategic bombing campaigns had reached a low ebb. The German offensive, a nine-month period of night bombing known as the Blitz, which had left London and many other British cities heavily damaged, had come to an end in May 1941 when the Luftwaffe had switched its resources to the invasion of the Soviet Union. Thereafter it had confined itself to hit-and-run raids on British coastal towns. Meanwhile, the RAF's night bombing offensive had been shown to be largely ineffective, as revealed by the Butt Report in August 1941, and by Christmas 1941 the attacks had largely petered out.

When the RAF offensive resumed in March 1942 with the bombing of Lübeck, there was a marked change in effectiveness. New heavy bombers (the Stirling and Halifax, followed by the unreliable Manchester from which was developed the excellent Lancaster), improved navigation systems (Gee and Oboe), new leadership (with the appointment of Air Vice-Marshal Harris) and new tactics (the bomber stream, use of incendiary bombs, and particularly area bombardment) all contributed. Prior to this the RAF had attempted to make precision attacks, aiming at individual factories, power stations, even post offices, in multiple strikes across the country; this had been costly and ineffective. Following the example of the Luftwaffe&apos;s November 1940 attack on Coventry, the RAF began concentrating a single blow against an area where several worthwhile targets existed, not least the homes and morale of the civilian population living there.

Planning
The destruction of Lübeck, and of Rostock the following month, shocked both the German leadership and population. Up to this point they had been little affected by the RAF's campaign. Now, Joseph Goebbels reported "the damage was really enormous" and "it is horrible ... the English air raids have increased in scope and importance; if they can be continued for weeks on these lines, they might conceivably have a demoralising effect on the population." After the bombing of Rostock he reported "the air raid ... was more devastating than those before. Community life there is practically at an end ... the situation is in some sections catastrophic ... seven-tenths of the city have been destroyed ... more than 100,000 people had to be evacuated ... there was, in fact, panic".

Hitler was enraged, and demanded that the Luftwaffe retaliate. On 14 April 1942 he ordered "that the air war against England be given a more aggressive stamp. Accordingly when targets are being selected, preference is to be given to those where attacks are likely to have the greatest possible effect on civilian life. Besides raids on ports and industry, terror attacks of a retaliatory nature [Vergeltungsangriffe] are to be carried out on towns other than London". After the raid on Bath, Goebbels reported that Hitler intended to "repeat these raids night after night until the English are sick and tired of terror attacks" and that he "shared [Goebbels'] opinion absolutely that cultural centres, health resorts and civilian centres must be attacked ... there is no other way of bringing the English to their senses. They belong to a class of human beings with whom you can only talk after you have first knocked out their teeth."

Name

The raids were referred to on both sides as "Baedeker raids", derived from a comment by a German propagandist. , a spokesman for the German Foreign Office, is reported to have said on 24 April 1942, "We shall go out and bomb every building in Britain marked with three stars in the Baedeker Guide", a reference to the popular travel guides of that name. Goebbels was furious; keen to brand British attacks as "terror bombing", he was equally keen to designate German efforts as "retaliatory measures". Stumm's off-the-cuff remark "effectively admitted the Germans were targetting cultural and historic targets, just what the German leadership did not want to do, and Goebbels took steps to make sure it did not happen again".

Raids
The task of carrying out the attacks was given to bomber groups of Luftflotte 3; these were KG 2 and KG 6 (formed from the earlier Küstenfliegergruppe 106 maritime aviation group), to be led by the pathfinders of I./KG 100. Each raid would involve 30 to 40 aircraft, and to increase their effectiveness it was planned each would fly two sorties per night. Thus each raid would involve two periods of 60 to 90 minutes, separated by two or three hours.

The first raid of the Baedeker Blitz was directed against Exeter, the ancient county town of Devon with its immense heritage of historic buildings, on the night of Saint George's Day, 23/24 April 1942. Whilst this raid caused little damage, a second raid the following night was more severe, with over 80 fatalities. On the nights of 25/26 and 26/27 April, the bomber force attacked Bath, causing widespread damage and some 400 casualties. These raids came a month after the Lübeck raid and coincided with the RAF's four-night offensive against Rostock. On 27/28 April, the Luftwaffe attacked Norwich, dropping more than 90 tons of bombs and causing 67 deaths. On 28/29 April, they attacked York, causing limited damage but 79 deaths.

On the night of 3/4 May the Luftwaffe returned to Exeter, causing heavy damage to the city centre, considerable damage to the south side of the Cathedral and 164 deaths. The following night they also attacked Cowes, a target of both cultural and military value, being the home of the J. Samuel White shipyard. On 8/9 May Norwich was attacked again, though the raid was ineffective despite more than 70 aircraft taking part. During May the Luftwaffe also bombed Hull (a major port, and thus a military target), Poole, Grimsby and, at the end of May, Canterbury. This raid, which coincided with the RAF's first thousand-bomber raid on Cologne, involved 77 bombers, dropping 40 tons of bombs, which resulted in 43 deaths.

Across all the raids in this period a total of 1,637 civilians were killed and 1,760 injured, and over 50,000 houses were destroyed. Some notable buildings were destroyed or damaged, including York's Guildhall and the Bath Assembly Rooms, but on the whole most escaped – the cathedrals of Norwich, and Canterbury and the minster at York included. Exeter Cathedral was hit in the early hours of 4 May with the complete destruction of St James Chapel on the south side and considerable damage to the South Quire Aisle. The German bombers suffered heavy losses for minimal damage inflicted, and the Axis' need for reinforcements in North Africa and Russian Front meant further operations could only continue at a reduced scale. Intermittent hit-and-run raids on coastal towns by Focke-Wulf Fw 190 fighter-bombers also continued.

On 27 April, Winston Churchill told the War Cabinet that the government should do all it could to "ensure that disproportionate publicity was not given to these raids" and "avoid giving the impression that the Germans were making full reprisal" for British raids.

Aftermath
Whilst the term "Baedeker Blitz" is sometimes limited to the raids on those five cities (Exeter, Bath, Canterbury, Norwich and York) in April and May 1942, in fact the Luftwaffe continued to target cities for their cultural value for the next two years. In June 1942 they attacked Ipswich, Poole and Canterbury again, Southampton (a port target), Norwich again and Weston-super-Mare. In July there were three raids on Birmingham, another three on Middlesbrough and one on Hull, all industrial cities of military and strategic value: But in August the Germans returned to "Baedeker" targets; Norwich, Swansea, Colchester and Ipswich.

In September they attacked Sunderland (a port and industrial centre) and Kings Lynn (a market town of no military value). All these raids were less intense than those of April and May, involving some 20 aircraft apiece; this reflected the steady and increasing losses suffered by the Germans as Britain's night-fighter defences improved and German casualties mounted. By the autumn KG 2 had lost 65 of its 88 crews and the offensive had come to a halt.

To find new ways to continue the pressure, the Luftwaffe experimented with both low-level and very high-level attacks. In August 1942 two modified Ju 86P bombers were employed making high-altitude runs over southern England. These operated with impunity for several weeks and one raid on Bristol on 28 August resulted in 48 fatalities. These flights were halted when the RAF fielded a similarly-modified flight of Spitfires and caught one of these bombers in the highest air battle of the war.

On 31 October 1942, thirty German fighter-bombers escorted by sixty fighters made a low-level attack on Canterbury, dropping 28 bombs on the city and causing 30 deaths. Three of the attacking aircraft were shot down.

By the end of that year, 3,236 people had been killed and 4,148 injured in these raids.  However, the strength of the Luftwaffe in the west had drained away while the RAF had gone from strength to strength, regularly mounting raids of 200 or more aircraft on Germany.

In 1943, the Luftwaffe in the west was revitalised and Luftflotte 3 brought back up to strength. In January KG 2 had 60 bombers (Do217's) and KG 6 the same number (Ju 88s). These were reinforced with a fast bomber wing, SKG 10 of Fw 190 fighter-bombers. These renewed the offensive; on 17/18 January 1943 they raided London, followed by a low-level attack on the city on 20 January. After a lull in February they returned in March leading to the Bethnal Green Tube disaster, where 178 people died.

Throughout the year raids were made on a variety of targets; some of strategic value (Southampton, Plymouth, Portsmouth, Hull, Sunderland, Newcastle) and others with little or none (Eastbourne, Hastings, Maidstone, Cheltenham, Chelmsford, Bournemouth, Lincoln). Again, new tactics were tried; in June 1943 a raid on Grimsby saw the use of delayed-action anti-personnel "butterfly bombs", which resulted in 163 civilian casualties, most of them from these devices as people returned to their homes after the all clear was sounded.

In November 1943, following the RAF and USAAF bombing of Hamburg and the first use of the "Window" radar countermeasure, the Luftwaffe were able to respond with a raid on Norwich, using Duppel, their equivalent. While British radar was negated, the raid caused little damage. With the continuing losses of experienced personnel the German crews were increasingly made up of inexperienced replacements, with a corresponding drop in effectiveness. By the end of 1943 the Luftwaffe had mounted some 20 raids, in which more than 10 tonnes of bombs had been dropped, a total of 2,320 tons for the whole year. These caused 2,372 deaths and 3,450 injuries, according to a report by Lord Cherwell. The report contrasted this with the RAF's achievement of a total of 136,000 tons dropped during the year, and pointed out that a single raid on Berlin (made in the same week that the report was published) had dropped 2,480 tons, more than the entire German effort. Furthermore, the report pointed out that these raids were confined to towns on or near the coast, and that fires caused by bombing only accounted for one-thirtieth of all the incidents dealt with by the National Fire Service.

The Baedeker-type raids ended in 1944, as the Germans realised they were ineffective; unsustainable losses were being suffered for no material gain. January 1944 saw a switch to London as the principal target for retaliation; on 21 January the Luftwaffe mounted Operation Steinbock, an all-out attack on London employing all of its available bomber force in the west. This too was largely a failure, with heavy losses for little gain. Henceforth, efforts were re-directed toward the ports that the Germans suspected were going to be used for the allied invasion of France, while the assault on London became the domain of Germany's V-weapons.

See also
 Strategic bombing during World War II
 Operation Diver
 Operation Gisela

Notes

References

Further reading
 BBC News: Blitzed by guidebook; retrieved February 2012
 BBC: People's War; retrieved February 2012
 Bath Blitz website; retrieved February 2012
 York Air Raids; retrieved February 2012

World War II aerial operations and battles of the Western European Theatre
1942 in England
The Blitz
Mass murder in 1942
World War II strategic bombing conducted by Germany
1942 in military history